The Kew Madagascar Conservation Centre (KMCC) is a non-governmental organisation working on plant research and conservation in Madagascar. It is a dependency of the Royal Botanic Gardens, Kew and Kew's third research site. Aside its main office in the capital Antananarivo, KMCC has local teams in Ambanja, Bongolava, Morondava and Itremo.

References

Plant conservation
Nature conservation in Madagascar